The Wigan by-election of 12 June 1958 was held after the death of the incumbent Labour Member of Parliament (MP) Ronald Williams.

The by-election was contested by three candidates: Alan Fitch (Labour), John Hodgson (Conservative), and Michael Weaver (Communist).

The result was a hold for the Labour Party, with Fitch gaining 71% of the vote on a 6.2% swing from the Conservative Party.

Result of the by-election

Result of the previous General Election

References

1958 elections in the United Kingdom
1958 in England
1950s in Lancashire
By-election, 1958
By-elections to the Parliament of the United Kingdom in Greater Manchester constituencies
By-elections to the Parliament of the United Kingdom in Lancashire constituencies